Lay It Down is the 29th studio album by American singer Al Green, released May 27, 2008, on Blue Note Records. The album was produced by Ahmir "Questlove" Thompson and James Poyser. The album features guest vocals from Anthony Hamilton, John Legend, and Corinne Bailey Rae.

Lay It Down peaked at number 9 on Billboards Top Album charts, and has received widespread acclaim from critics. At the 51st Annual Grammy Awards, the album was nominated for Best R&B Album but lost to Jennifer Hudson's self-titled album. "Stay With Me (By the Sea)" won Al Green and John Legend the Best R&B Performance by a Duo or Group with Vocal award, and "You've Got the Love I Need" won Green and Anthony Hamilton the award for Best Traditional R&B Vocal Performance.

Critical reception
Lay It Down has received much critical acclaim. It currently holds a rating of 81/100 on review aggregator website Metacritic, based on 22 critical reviews, indicating "universal acclaim".

The album was applauded for bringing in younger producers which critics claimed gave the album a more youthful sound. Thom Jurek for Allmusic commented: "What happens when you put that amazing soul-drenched voice in the hands of hip-hop producers Questlove and James Poyser, and add a slew of superstar guests? Answer: a killer Al Green soul album". In a review for Blender, Ben Ratliff remarked that Green had "created a natural-sounding album with occasional horns and strings, taking cues directly from [his] best old records". "Lay It Down" was number 15 on Rolling Stones list of the 100 Best Songs of 2008.

Track listing

Personnel
Adapted from CD liner notes.
Al Green – vocals
Anthony Hamilton – vocals (3), background vocals (1, 3)
Corinne Bailey Rae – vocals (6), background vocals (6, 8)
John Legend – vocals (8), background vocals (8)
Chalmers "Spanky" Alford – guitar
Randy Bowland – additional guitar (2, 3, 8, 11)
James Poyser – piano, organ
Adam Blackstone – bass (1-5, 7-11)
Owen Biddle – bass (6)
Ahmir "?uestlove" Thompson – drums (1-10)
Homer Steinweiss – drums (11)
Danny Sadownick – percussion (2, 5, 11)
The Dap-Kings Horns – horns
Neal Sugarman – tenor saxophone
Ian Hendrickson Smith – baritone
Jaguar Wright, Mercedes Martinez – background vocalsAdditional personnel'
Larry Gold – string orchestrator and conductor (1, 3, 6, 7, 9)
Al Green, James Poyser, Ahmir "?uestlove" Thompson – producer
Richard Nichols, Eli Wolf – executive producer

Charts

Weekly charts

Year-end charts

References

2008 albums
Al Green albums
Blue Note Records albums
Albums produced by Questlove
Albums produced by James Poyser